Endlings is a Canadian television science fiction series, premiering January 5, 2020 on CBC Television. The series is produced by Sinking Ship Entertainment. Endlings premiered in the US on Hulu on January 17, 2019.

In October 2019, the series was renewed for a second twelve-episode season.

Premise
The series centres on four young children living with a foster father, Mr. Leopold (Neil Crone) on a farm, who discover an extraterrestrial alien on their property after its spaceship crashes, and become drawn into the adventure of helping the alien in its mission to save endangered species.

Plot

Season 1 
The season begins in the year 2040 when an alien being abducts the last elephant on Earth, Tuko, from the African wildlife refuge where she's lived since she was orphaned as a baby. But before the Alien can leave Earth's atmosphere, its ship malfunctions and crash lands on a farm in North America. The crash happens just as Mr. Leopold, the foster parent who owns the farm, is about to take in Julia, a new foster kid, to join his other wards: Johnny, Tabby and Finn.

Almost as soon as she arrives, Julia runs away but finding the last elephant on Earth in one of Mr. Leopold's cornfields makes her turn back. While Julia, Johnny, Tabby and Finn are not fast friends, they do learn to work together when they discover that an alien ship has crashed into the barn with an injured alien inside and another escaped insect alien loose on the farm.

Julia, though initially wary of her newfound family, slowly learns to trust her fellow foster kids. But just as she grows more comfortable opening up to the others about the struggles she experienced prior to ending up at the Leopold farmstead, Johnny, Tabby and Finn start to reveal painful memories from their pasts.

At the same time, the Alien, unfamiliar with Earth's natural environment and unable to communicate directly with its new caretakers, is steadily growing weaker. Fortunately, Abiona Maina, the wildlife activist who cared for Tuko at the refuge, manages to track the elephant down to Mr. Leopold's farm. After she's convinced that the Alien isn't evil, Abiona uses her knowledge of animals to save its life.

The kids have a lot to deal with but, luckily, they also have each other to rely upon. This growing bond is especially helpful as it will take their combined talents to recapture the endlings released when the Alien's ship crashed into their barn. These include endlings that communicate in a variety of different ways, like frequencies too high or too low for humans to hear, endlings that are more bark than bite, as well as endlings that the kids want to keep forever, even though they shouldn't.

Season 2 
The year is 2041; Julia, Johnny, Tabby and Finn continue to help their extraterrestrial friend Ling save fantastical endlings. With the aid of their foster father Mr. Leopold and animal activist Dr. Abiona Maina the group is getting closer to receiving the remaining 'last of their kind' creatures and completing their mission.

But when Ling accidentally shows Tabby a vision of their quest failing, the team learns that Ling's powers don't just shows their pasts but also their futures. This glimpse of what's to come reveals Tresa Hewes CEO of Infinitum Corporation, who has been tracking them on her own illusive reasons, capturing Ling and the endlings and tearing the foster family apart.

Together, the group makes the choice to confront the pain of their pasts in order to change their futures and save Ling. This decision to fight fate, kicks off a season of high-octane adventure where four wounded teens must learn to let their hopes, not their hurts, shape their future.

Cast

Edison Grant as Johnny, the eldest child and first child to arrive at the Leopold household. Johnny works hard to make sure the farm feels like the first real home for the other kids, just like it does for him. 
Kamaia Fairburn as Julia, the latest addition to the Leopold household. Ever since the sudden loss of her father, Julia has just been mad — mad at the world, mad at her situation, mad at her sadness. However, the more time she spends with her new foster family the more she warms up to them.
Michela Luci as Tabby, the second-youngest child and the engineer of the family. Tabby has a sharp tongue and quick wit which developed from constantly being let down by a lot of people in her life.
Cale Thomas Ferrin as Finn, the youngest child on the farm. Finn doesn't speak a word but communicates his love through his colorful drawings, his expressive face or his hugs.
Neil Crone as Mr. Leopold, the foster parent of the four kids. Mr. Leopold knows that what these kids need is someone to believe in them, because the world doesn't.
Oyin Oladejo as Tuko's caretaker, a wildlife activist who spent her childhood growing up around animals. Her fight to keep Tuko safe leads her to the Leopold farm.
Lisa Ryder as Hewes, an intelligent forward lead who is part of a special division of the government that tracks unexplained phenomenon.

Episodes

Season 1 (2020)

Season 2 (2021)

Production
Season One was filmed in and around the city of Guelph, Ontario and the second season was scheduled to also be filmed in that city, starting January 6, 2020. Production of the second season commenced in October 2019.

Broadcast
In addition to CBC and Hulu, the series will air on Universal Kids in the US, CBBC in the UK, Norddeutscher Rundfunk in Germany, ABC Me in Australia, Sveriges Television in Sweden, NRK in Norway, and Gloob in Brazil.

References

External links

2020s Canadian children's television series
2020s Canadian drama television series
2020s Canadian science fiction television series
2020 Canadian television series debuts
Canadian children's science fiction television series
Canadian television shows featuring puppetry
CBC Television original programming
Fictional endangered and extinct species
Hulu original programming
Hulu children's programming
Television series about alien visitations
Television series about children
Television series about extraterrestrial life
Television shows set on farms
Children's and Family Emmy Award winners